GESS (German European School Singapore) is an international, multi-lingual, co-educational school in Singapore. GESS provides education to 1,800 students from more than 65 nationalities. The GESS philosophy of “Celebrate your roots, Discover your wings” forms the backbone of its approach to education as the school supports and nurtures its students to become balanced, responsible and informed world citizens.

Since its foundation in 1971, the school has evolved into one school – two system organisation. The IB Section offers all three International Baccalaureate Programmes (PYP, MYP, DP) in English. As a German government accredited “Excellent German School Abroad”, the German Curriculum Section of GESS offers all German school leaving certificates. The school is the largest "German school abroad" in Asia. GESS focuses on European languages and culture. For Dutch and Danish students the school offers a mother-tongue programme fully integrated in the curriculum of the European section with no additional costs. The Dutch programme is developed in cooperation with Rijnsland Education Worldwide. A similar mother-tongue programme has been developed for Danish students as well, offering Danish lessons from preschool onwards and for Primary School it is integrated into the timetable (5 lessons per week) with no additional costs.

History
The first lessons at the German School were taught on 25 August 1971 with six students enrolled. In April 1972, less than a year after the initial opening, the Kindergarten and Pre-School opened their doors. The school continued to grow quickly and the completion of a new school building at 72 Bukit Tinggi Road laid the foundation for the GESS Main Campus. During 2004, the Board of Governors made the significant decision to offer students tuition in English as well as German and pursue accreditation with the International Baccalaureate Organization. As a result, the school's name was changed to the German European School Singapore (GESS). The following school year, the European IB (English speaking) section of the school started teaching the IB curriculum for grades 1 to 12. Growing student numbers, lead to the decision to open a separate Junior School campus at Jalan Jurong Kechil in August 2008. This was then home to students of both the German and European sections from grade 1 to 5. In 2010, the GESS pre-school department received accreditation to teach the Primary Years Programme IB curriculum and GESS became a fully certified, IB World School. In 2013, the accreditation by the Council of International Schools followed.

Since August 2018 the students now visit a brand new and purpose build campus at 2 Dairy Farm Lane. All students from Preschool, Primary School and Secondary School are now together under one roof. The project has opened a new chapter in the school's history as two previous campuses are now consolidated into one purpose-built school with brand new facilities. The old main campus was sub-leased to Chatsworth International School. The land for the Junior School Campus was returned to the government.

Academic programme
GESS offers academic programmes for pre-school, primary and secondary levels.

Since the decision to offer multi-lingual education, GESS has operated in two distinct yet cohesive sections. The GESS European section offers the IB Programme in English and the German section uses the German language to teach all German school leaving certificates. GESS teaches both German and English language lessons at differing levels in both sections.

For a secondary language the school teaches Mandarin, Latin, French, Spanish, English, Danish, Dutch and German.

Activities 
In 2017, the school conducted a youth football camp in partnership with five-time Bundesliga champion Borussia Monchengladbach.

Campus
The new purpose build GESS campus, opened at Dairy Farm Lane in August 2018. The building costs were about $135 million and the campus spans across a 30,580 sqm site.

Facilities 

 Olympic-size swimming pool, 
 football field, 
 cooking studio, 
 400-seat auditorium, 
 black box theatre, 
 3 Libraries (pre-school, primary school and secondary school) 
 design technology studio that aims to promote engineering among 13-and 14-year-olds.

Green features 
Also, the building facade is shrouded in vertical greenery, and features a rainwater-harvesting system and rain garden to irrigate plants and filter rainwater runoff. It also has two solar panels built on top of block F.

References

External links

 

Singapore
International schools in Singapore
Germany–Singapore relations
Educational institutions established in 1971